As of 1 January 2020, Spain had a total population of 47,431,256, which represents a 0.9% increase since 2019. The modern Kingdom of Spain arose from the accretion of several independent Iberian realms, including the Kingdoms of León, Castile, Navarre, the Crown of Aragon and Granada,  all of which, together with the modern state of Portugal, were successor states to the late antique Christian Visigothic Kingdom after the Reconquista.

Spain's population peaked in 2019, surpassing for the first time in history 47 million inhabitants. As of January 2020, there were already 47,431,256 people living in Spain. With the exception of the capital Madrid, the most densely populated areas lie around the coast.

The population of Spain doubled during the twentieth century, but the pattern of growth was extremely uneven due to large-scale internal migration from the rural interior to the industrial cities. Eleven of Spain's fifty provinces saw an absolute decline in population over the century.

The last quarter of the century saw a dramatic fall in birth rates. Spain's fertility rate of 1.47 (the number of children the average woman will have during her lifetime) has climbed every year since the late 1990s. The birth rate has climbed in 10 years from 9.10 births per 1000 people per year in 1996 to 10.9 in 2006, before declining again to 7.13 by 2021.

In 2021 the Total Fertility Rate of Spain (average number of children per woman) was 1.19, and 3.7% was the percent of births to women that were their 4th+ child.

Spain accepted 478,990 new immigrant residents in the first six months of 2022 alone. During these first six months, 220,443 people also emigrated from Spain, leaving a record-breaking net migration figure of 258,547. The data shows that more women than men chose to move to Spain during 2022, this is due to higher rates of emigration from Latin America.

History
Notable events in modern Spanish demography:
 Late 19th century and early 20th century: Relative economic stagnation and mass emigration to American countries.
 1918. Flu pandemic, over 200,000 dead in Spain.
 1936. Start of the Spanish Civil War.
 1939. End of the Civil War. Establishment of a dictatorship, Start of rationing policies. Deepening of economic depression, mass emigration to European and American countries due to economic and political motives (Republican exile).
 1941. Approval of benefits for large families, with at least four children.
 1945. Establishment of tax deductions for parents.
 1952. End of rationing policies.
 1975. End of the dictatorship, mass return of emigrated people.
 1977. Legalization of contraception. Decline of birth rates.
 1985. Legalization of abortion.
 1988. After centuries of outwards emigration, the first events of illegal immigration from Africa occur.
 1991. Spain becomes a net receiver of immigrants, after decades of mass emigration.
 1994. Lowering of threshold of requirements to become a large family, only three children needed.
 2007. Approval of €2,500 benefit for births.
 2010. Legalization of elective abortion.
 2011. Withdrawal of the €2,500 benefit for births.
 2015. First negative natural change since the Civil War due to the aging of Spanish population.

The population of Spain doubled during the twentieth century as a result of the demographic boom in the 1960s and early 1970s. After that time, the birth rate fell during the 1980s and Spain's population became stalled.

Many demographers have linked Spain's very low fertility rate to the country's lack of a family support policy. Spain spends the least on family support out of all western European countries—0.5% of GDP. A graphic illustration of the enormous social gulf in this field is the fact that a Spanish family would need to have 57 children to enjoy the same financial support as a family with 3 children in Luxembourg.

During the early 2000s, the mean year-on-year demographic growth set a new record with its 2003 peak variation of 2.1%, doubling the previous record reached back in the 1960s when a mean year-on-year growth of 1% was experienced. In 2005 alone, the immigrant population of Spain increased by 700,000 people.

The arrival of migrating young adults was the main reason for the slight increase in Spain's fertility rate. From 2002 through 2008 the Spanish population grew by 8%, of which 7% were foreign.

Population 
The following demographic statistics are from the World Population Review in 2019.
One birth every minute
One death every minute
Net gain of one person every 131 minutes
One net migrant every 13 minutes

Note: Crude migration change (per 1000) is a trend analysis, an extrapolation based average population change (current year minus previous) minus natural change of the current year (see table vital statistics). As average population is an estimate of the population in the middle of the year and not end of the year.

Population growth 

Population growth rate

-0.03% (2021 est.) Country comparison to the world: 143rd
0.78% (2017 est.)

Life expectancy 

1882-1950

Sources: Our World In Data and the United Nations.

1950-2015

Source: UN World Population Prospects

Life expectancy at birth

total population: 82.21 years. Country comparison to the world: 29nd
male: 79.22 years
female: 85.39 years (2021 est.)

Infant mortality rate

3.14 deaths/1,000 live births (2021 est.). Country comparison to the world: 216th

Crude death rate

9.78 deaths/1,000 population (2021 est.) Country comparison to the world: 55th

Fertility 

The total fertility rate is the number of children born per woman. It is based on fairly good data for the entire period. Sources: Our World In Data and Gapminder Foundation.

Crude birth rate

8.05 births/1,000 population (2021 est.) Country comparison to the world: 212th

Total fertility rate

1.51 children born/woman (2021 est.) Country comparison to the world: 207th

Mother's mean age at first birth

30.9 years (2017 est.)

Age structure 
0-14 years:
15.02% (male 3,861,522/female 3,650,085)
15-24 years:
9.9% (male 2,557,504/female 2,392,498)
25-54 years:
43.61% (male 11,134,006/female 10,675,873)
55-64 years:
12.99% (male 3,177,080/female 3,319,823)
65 years and over:
18.49% (male 3,970,417/female 5,276,984) (2020 est.)

Median age:

total: 43.9 years. Country comparison to the world: 21st
male: 42.7 years
female: 45.1 years (2020 est.)

Vital statistics

Statistics since 1900

In 2021 264,897 (78.6%) babies were born to mothers with Spanish nationality (including naturalized immigrants), 23,704 (7%) to mothers with an African nationality (including North Africa), 21,769 (6.5%) to mothers with an American nationality (both North and South America), 19,903 (5.9%) to mothers with a European nationality (both EU and non-EU countries of Europe), and 6,393 (1.9%) to mothers with an Asian nationality.

Current vital statistics

Employment and income 
Unemployment, youth ages 15–24
total: 34.3%. Country comparison to the world: 24th
male: 35.2%
female: 33.3% (2018 est.)

Metropolitan areas 

The largest metropolitan areas in 2007 were:

 Madrid	6,489,162
 Barcelona	5,375,774
 Valencia	1,705,742
 Seville	1,519,639
 Bilbao	950,155
 Málaga 897,563
Asturias (Gijón–Oviedo–Avilés) 857,079
Alicante–Elche 748,565
Zaragoza 731,803
Vigo - Pontevedra 662,412
Las Palmas de Gran Canaria 616,903
Bahía de Cádiz (Cádiz–Jerez de la Frontera) 615,494
Santa Cruz de Tenerife 573,825
Murcia 563,272
Palma de Mallorca 474,035
Granada 472,638
San Sebastián 402,168
Tarragona 406,042
A Coruña 403,007
Valladolid 400,400
Santander–Torrelavega 391,480
Córdoba 323,600
Pamplona 309,631

Islands
Islander population (The surface of the islands will be given in hectares except for the largest islands of the Canary and Balearic archipelagos, as well as the Plazas de Soberanía.):

 Tenerife 886,033
 Majorca 846,210
 Gran Canaria 829,597
 Lanzarote 132,366
 Ibiza 113,908
 Fuerteventura 94,386
 Menorca 86,697
 La Palma 85,933
 La Gomera 22,259
 El Hierro 10,558
 Formentera 7,957
 Arousa 4,889
 La Graciosa 658
 Tabarca 105
 Ons 61

Ethnic groups 

Definition of ethnicity or nationality in Spain is fraught politically. The term "Spanish people" (pueblo español) is defined in the 1978 constitution as the political sovereign, i.e. the citizens of the Kingdom of Spain. The same constitution in its preamble speaks of "peoples and nationalities of Spain" (pueblos y nacionalidades de España) and their respective cultures, traditions, languages and institutions.
The formerly nomadic Gitanos and Mercheros are distinctly marked by endogamy and discrimination but they are dispersed through the country.

The native Canarians are partly the descendants of the North African population of the Canary Islands prior to Spanish colonization in the 15th century although many Spaniards have varying levels of North African admixture as a result of the Islamic period. Also included are many Spaniard citizens who are descendants of people from Spain's former colonies, mostly from Equatorial Guinea, Argentina, Dominican Republic, Ecuador, Peru, Colombia, Morocco and the Philippines. There is also a sizable number of Spaniards of Eastern European, Maghrebian, Sub Saharan-African, Indian subcontinent and Middle Eastern descent.

As of 2019, native-born Spanish citizens of all ethnic groups make up 84.6% of the total population, and 15.4% are immigrants, both naturalized and foreign. Among the immigrants, around 45% of them come from Spain's former territories in America (primarily Ecuador, Peru, Venezuela and Colombia). The rest are predominantly North African, Eastern European and Western European.

Immigration 

In terms of emigration vs. immigration, after decades of net emigration after the Spanish Civil War, Spain has experienced massive large-scale immigration for the first time in modern history over the past 30 years. As of 2020, there were 7,231,195 foreign-born people in Spain, making up to 15.23% of the Spanish population including 5,015,263 (10.57%) born in a non-European country. Of these, 5,434,153 (11.45%) didn't have the Spanish citizenship. This makes Spain one of the world's preferred destinations to immigrate to, being the 4th country in Europe by immigration numbers and the 10th worldwide. Of these, more than 860,000 were Romanian, and 760,000 were Moroccan while the number of Ecuadorians was around 390,000. Colombian population amounted to around 300,000. There are also a significant number of British (359,076 as of 2011, but more than one million are estimated to live permanently in Spain) and German (195,842) citizens, mainly in Alicante, Málaga provinces, Balearic Islands and Canary Islands. The largest Asian immigrant group, the Chinese, number slightly over 166,000. Immigrants from several sub-Saharan African countries have also settled in Spain as contract workers, representing 4.08% of all the foreign residents in the country.

Foreign population 

As of 2018, the region had a foreign population of 4,734,691. The largest groups of foreigners were those of Moroccan, Romanian, British, Chinese and Italian citizenship.
Meanwhile, Spain had a foreign-born population of 6,742,948, being those born in the Americas the largest group, and Europe being the second most common continent of origin after South America.

Religions 

The Reconquista was the long process by which the Catholics reconquered Spain from Islamic rule by 1492.  The Spanish Inquisition was established in 1478  to complete the religious orthodoxy of the Iberian Peninsula. In the centuries that followed, Spain saw itself as the bulwark of Catholicism and doctrinal purity; since then, Catholicism has been the main religion in Spain.

Spanish missionaries carried Catholicism to the Americas and the Philippines, establishing various missions in the newly colonized lands. The missions served as a base for both administering colonies as well as spreading Christianity.

The Spanish Constitution of 1978 abolished Catholicism as the official state religion, but recognizing the role it plays in Spanish society.
From the end of the Francoist dictatorship to the present day, a secularization process has taken place that has meant a progressive decrease in religious practice, in the attendance at the different religious rites (baptisms, communions and Catholic marriages) and in the percentage of Spaniards who identify as Catholic, Consequently, a majority of Spaniards today ignore Catholic doctrines on matters such as pre-marital sex, homosexuality and contraception. Despite the drop, Catholic identity nevertheless remains an important part of Spain's culture.

, 68.5% of the population define themselves as Catholic, 26.4% as non-believers or atheists, and 2.6% other religions according to the official Spanish Center for Sociological Research. Among believers, 59% assert they almost never go to any religious service, by contrast, 16.3% attend one or more religious service almost every week.

A study made by the Union of Islamic Communities of Spain demonstrated that there were about 1,700,000 inhabitants of Muslim background living in Spain , accounting for 3–4% of the total population of Spain. The vast majority was composed of immigrants and descendants originating from Morocco and other African countries. More than 514,000 (30%) of them had Spanish nationality.

Languages 
Spanish 99% (88% mother tongue) (official nationwide)
Catalan 16% (9% mother tongue) (co-official in Catalonia, Balearic Islands, and Valencia — see Valencian)
Galician 7% (5% mother tongue) (co-official in Galicia)
Basque 1.6% (1% mother tongue) (co-official in Basque Country and designated areas in Navarre).
Aranese (a variant of Gascon Occitan) is co-official in Val d'Aran, a small valley in the Pyrenees.

Others with no official status:
Asturian-Leonese (in the former Kingdom of León and Asturias)
Aragonese (in the province of Huesca, Aragon)
Arabic (in the autonomous city of Ceuta)
Tarifit (in the autonomous city of Melilla)

Educational system
About 70% of Spain's students in non-university education attend public schools, whereas 79,1% of students in higher education are enrolled at public universities. The remainder attend private schools or universities, many of which are operated by the Catholic Church.

Compulsory education begins with primary school or general basic education for ages 6–16. It is free in public schools and in many private schools, most of which receive government subsidies. Following graduation, students attend either a secondary school offering a general high school diploma or a school of professional study in all fields – law, sciences, humanities, and medicine – and the technical schools offer programs in engineering and architecture.

Notes

See also

 Health in Spain
 List of Spaniards
 Romani people in Spain
 Ranked list of Spanish autonomous communities

References

External links
Spanish Instituto Nacional de Estadística Statistical data about demography and population
 Build Spanish population graph 1960 - 2013 (World Bank data)
 Build Spanish population projection graph till 2100 (United Nation data)
 Build Spanish life expectancy at birth graph 1950 - 2013 (United Nation data)